Lucas Nicolas Bravo (born 26 March 1988) is a French actor and model. He is best known for starring in the Netflix romantic comedy series Emily in Paris (2020–present) as chef Gabriel, Emily's downstairs love interest. He is also known for his roles in the  comedy-drama Mrs. Harris Goes to Paris (2022) and the romantic comedies Ticket to Paradise (2022), and The Honeymoon (2022).

Biography
Bravo was born on 26 March 1988 in Nice, Alpes-Maritimes, the son of retired French footballer Daniel Bravo and singer Eva Bravo. He attended the Lycée Pasteur in Neuilly-sur-Seine.

Bravo made his screen debut in Sous le soleil de Saint Tropez (2013). The following year, he appeared as Antoine Mufla in the French comedy-drama film La Crème de la crème, directed by Kim Chapiron. Since 2020, he has been starring opposite Lily Collins in the Netflix romantic comedy series Emily in Paris as Chef Gabriel, Emily's downstairs neighbor and love interest.

Bravo starred in Mrs. Harris Goes to Paris, with Lesley Manville, Isabelle Huppert, and Jason Isaacs, directed by Anthony Fabian, and based on Paul Gallico's novella of the same name. In August, it was reported that he will appear in Dean Craig's upcoming film The Honeymoon,  alongside Maria Bakalova. In October, he was cast in the romantic comedy Ticket to Paradise starring George Clooney, Julia Roberts and Kaitlyn Dever, and directed by Ol Parker.

Bravo is also a professional model represented by the Viva agency in Paris.

Filmography

Film

Television

References

External links

French actors
Male actors from Nice, France
French male models
Living people
1988 births